The Swedish Sailors and Coalers Union was a trade union in Sweden. It was the first viable maritime union in the country (following a short-lived Seamen and Coalers Trade Union founded in Göteborg in 1884). Charles Lindley was the main organizer of the union. Its Göteborg branch was founded in 1899.

The union published the monthly magazine Sjöfolkets tidning.

The union was dissolved in 1914 as it was bifurcated into two separate unions, the Sailors Union and the Coalers Union.

References

Trade unions in Sweden
Seafarers' trade unions
Trade unions established in 1899
Trade unions disestablished in 1914